Douglas Park railway station is located on the Main South line in New South Wales, Australia. It serves the town of Douglas Park, opening on 6 September 1869 as Douglass Park being renamed on 31 July 1891. It was relocated to its present site on 13 June 1892.

Platforms & services
Douglas Park has two side platforms. It is serviced by NSW TrainLink Southern Highlands Line services travelling between Campbelltown and Moss Vale with 2 weekend morning services to Sydney Central and limited evening services to Goulburn.

References

External links

Douglas Park station details Transport for New South Wales

Railway stations in Australia opened in 1869
Railway stations in Australia opened in 1892
Regional railway stations in New South Wales
Short-platform railway stations in New South Wales, 2 cars
Main Southern railway line, New South Wales